Normalville is an unincorporated community in Fayette County, Pennsylvania, United States. Normalville has a post office with ZIP code 15469, which opened on January 18, 1853.

References

Unincorporated communities in Fayette County, Pennsylvania
Unincorporated communities in Pennsylvania